St. Benno  is located in Maxvorstadt, Munich, Bavaria, Germany. 
The large church with two spires was built from 1888 to 1895 under design by Leonhard Romeis in the Romanesque Revival style. The St. Benno Church is one of the most convincing neo-Romanesque sacred buildings of the 19th century, next to the parish church of St. Anna in Lehel.

Buildings and structures in Munich
Maxvorstadt